European route E 40 (E 40) is a west–east European route, running from the port of Calais in France to Altai Mountains near Ridder in Kazakhstan.

In Ukraine, the highway runs through northern regions from the Polish border near Krakovets through Lviv, Zhytomyr, Kyiv, Poltava, Kharkiv, and Luhansk to the Russian border near Izvaryne.

Main route 
It passes nine regions: Lviv Oblast, Rivne Oblast, Zhytomyr Oblast, Kyiv Oblast, Kyiv City, Poltava Oblast, Kharkiv Oblast, Donetsk Oblast, and Luhansk Oblast.

See also

References

External links

040
Ukr